Star Trek is a 1979 pinball game developed by Bally. It was the first pinball machine based on the franchise of the same name. A second pinball machine of the same name was released in 1991 by Data East. A third pinball machine of the same name was released by Stern Pinball in 2013.

Description
First versions of the backglass showed the crew of the Enterprise dressed in the uniforms from the original Star Trek television series. This was changed early in the production to show them dressed in single-color clothing to fit with the film Star Trek: The Motion Picture that was to be released at the same time as the game. Gameplay includes 2 Flippers, 3 Pop bumpers, one Kick-out hole, one 4-bank drop targets and a free ball return lane.

The table has also made an appearance in Rammstein's "Amerika" music video.

See also
Star Trek: The Next Generation

References

External links
 IPDB listing for Star Trek

Pinball machines based on Star Trek
Bally pinball machines
1979 pinball machines
Pinball machines based on films
Pinball machines based on television series